Pleasant View, Alberta may refer to:

Pleasant View, Alberta, a locality in Athabasca County, Alberta
Pleasant View, Brazeau County, Alberta, a locality in Brazeau County, Alberta
Pleasant View, Strathcona County, a locality in Strathcona County, Alberta